The men's long jump event at the 1996 World Junior Championships in Athletics was held in Sydney, Australia, at International Athletic Centre on 21 and 22 August.

Medalists

Results

Final
22 August

Qualifications
21 Aug

Group A

Group B

Participation
According to an unofficial count, 35 athletes from 29 countries participated in the event.

References

Long jump
Long jump at the World Athletics U20 Championships